June, stylized as june and formerly called Filles TV until October 2009, is a TV channel which launched on 1 September 2004. This channel is mainly distributed in France and it is available on Canalsat, cable and ADSL.

History 
When June was launched as Filles TV, the channel broadcast girl programmes and emissions for girls aged 10 to 18 such as South of Nowhere, Frequency 4, So?, Degrassi: The Next Generation, My Lifestar, Is there a brain in this model? or The Janice Dickinson Modeling Agency.
All the programmes which used to air in June was dubbed in French. But Sabrina, the Teenage witch was given in French subtitles.

In 2006, June decided to change its logo and hence, the second logo was Filles with the 'T' mark on TV.

Then in 2007, June changed its logo again by keeping the T and keeping Filles vertically with a big TV. However, this logo was looking very funny. Hence, they changed the logo again.

Until 13 October 2009, Filles TV became June Hence, June started broadcasting newer shows like Skins etc. and some animated series like Sabrina and Nana

Slogans

Filles TV (2004 – October 2009): "Enterrez votre vie de jeune fille"June (since October 2009): "La télé qui donne envie d'être une fille"

Programs

2006–2007 season

Emily
Kawai
The show features a "tribe" pretty facilitators, each with a specific personality. Brown, blonde, Mediterranean or angelic, each giving his opinion and style in writing his columns. They offer a blog, via the website of the chain. Facilitators: Leah, Emmy, Baya, Alison, Laureline, Djenne and Audrey

2009–2010 season

June offers seven days with them, a weekly magazine run by Claire Elizabeth Beaufort accompanied by five journalists aged 20–30 years including Zazon. In a setting of apartment, they review the news of the week. Each columnist for his chosen field: fashion, environment, welfare, cheap ...

June offers the weekly June's people Gossip, a period of six minutes. Juliette Longuet, French designer based in New York, says the collaboration already established with Girls TV for the appointment New York City. The show delivers tips and useful addresses for the American metropolis and also address the capital of Paris, with Paris, Paris.

Regarding fiction, June diffuse season 2 of the seriesSamantha Who?,Season 1 The L Word, Season 2 of Skins and first five seasons of Dawson.

The chain is also involved in the emission of reality TV to deal with fashion and art. Anne Slowey, editor of a famous American women's magazine offers Stylista, the subject of the recruitment of an assistant. The Janice Dickinson Modeling Agency reveals the castings made by the former wife of Sylvester Stallone and boss of a modeling agency, Janice Dickinson. Going against the foot of a beauty contest which it takes the form, the show In search of inner beauty is in competition of candidates who unbeknownst to them, their human qualities.

Series

Notes and references

Related

 Canal J
 Gulli
 Lagardère Active
 TiJi

External links
  June http://www.june.fr Official Website
  Site http://www.allocine.fr/programme-tv/chaine-20074/ chain to Allociné

Television stations in France
Television channels and stations established in 2004
2004 establishments in France
Television channels and stations disestablished in 2016
2016 disestablishments in France